WLLT (94.3 FM) is a radio station licensed to Polo, Illinois, covering Northern Illinois, including Dixon, Sterling, Rock Falls, and Morrison. WLLT currently has an oldies format and is owned by Sauk Valley Broadcasting Company. WLLT also airs local high school sporting events and features local news. The offices and studio are located just east of Sterling, Illinois.

History
The station began broadcasting at 107.7 MHz on December 12, 1989, and aired a soft adult contemporary format. By 2006, the station had begun airing an oldies format. On June 25, 2018, the station's frequency was changed to 94.3 MHz, as part of a three-way frequency swap with WQUD in Erie, Illinois and WSSQ in Sterling, Illinois.

References

External links

Oldies radio stations in the United States
LLT
Radio stations established in 1989
1989 establishments in Illinois